The women's individual pursuit was one of the 4 women's events at the 1995 UCI Track Cycling World Championships, held in Bogotá, Colombia.

Quarter-finals

Semi-finals

Final

Final standings

References

Women's individual pursuit
UCI Track Cycling World Championships – Women's individual pursuit
UCI